Eugène Eyraud (1820 – 23 August 1868) was a lay friar of the Congregation of the Sacred Hearts of Jesus and Mary and the first Westerner to live on Easter Island.

Early life 
Eyraud was born in Saint-Bonnet-en-Champsaur, France, in 1820.  He became a mechanic by profession.  

He went to Bolivia, and acquired mining interests there.

Arrival on Easter Island

Eyraud entered the Holy Ghost Fathers as a novice. Influenced by his brother Jean, a missionary in China, he left Chile for Tahiti in 1862 and arrived at Hanga Roa on 2 January 1864. He was harassed by the islanders, and only stayed nine months before being repatriated to Chile on 11 October 1864. A year and a half later, on 27 March 1866, he settled on the island as a full priest, accompanied by Hippolyte Roussel and three Mangarevan converts.

Activities 
Although fiercely opposed at first, Eyraud eventually came to be highly popular and influential among the islanders. In October 1866, Gaspar Zumbohm and Théodule Escolan joined Eyraud and Roussel in their mission, and set up schools at Hanga Roa and Vaihū.

On 22 December 1866 Eyraud wrote

He assisted that year in what would be the last ceremony of the Birdman cult.

Tuberculosis came to the island in 1867, which led to the death of a quarter of the island's population, and Eyraud died of it on 23 August 1868, nine days after the last islanders had been baptized.

He was buried at the Holy Cross Church, Hanga Roa.

Rongorongo 
During his first stay, Eyraud remarked that in each house there were wooden tablets covered with "hieroglyphs", now known as rongorongo, but that the islanders no longer knew how to read them and paid them scant attention. He didn't think of informing Roussel or Zumbohm, and never wrote of them again. In wasn't until 1869, when Zumbohm presented a gift which, unknown to him included a tablet, to Bishop Jaussen in Tahiti, that rongorongo was noticed by the outside world.

Traditional beliefs

Eyraud wrote of the islanders and their carved wooden statues, known as mo‘ai kavakava

Bibliography 
 Orliac, Catherine; Orliac, Michel. L'île de Pâques : Des dieux regardent les étoiles, collection "Découvertes Gallimard" (nº 38), série Histoire. Gallimard, 2004.  (new edition; originally published in 1988 under the title Des dieux regardent les étoiles : Les derniers secrets de l'Île de Pâques, translated into English in 1995 as Easter Island: Mystery of the Stone Giants [U.S.] and The Silent Gods: Mysteries of Easter Island [UK]).
 E. Eyraud, « Lettres au T.R.P, Congrégation du sacré-cœur de Jésus et de Marie », Annales Association de la propagation de la foi, vol.38, Lyon 1866 : 52-61 et 124-138.

References

External links
 Correspondence of Eugène Eyraud 
Easter Island Foundation sells an English translation of Eyraud's report, along with those of Hippolyte Roussel, Pierre Loti and Alphonse Pinart, under the title Early Visitors to Easter Island 1864-1877.

Roman Catholic missionaries in Easter Island
French Roman Catholic missionaries
Picpus Fathers
1868 deaths
1820 births
French expatriates in Ecuador
Rongorongo